On December 26, 1987, a bomb attack on a United Service Organizations (USO) club in Barcelona, Spain killed an American sailor and injured nine others. The attack, on Bar Iruña, was perpetrated by Catalan nationalist terrorists. 22-year-old Ronald Strong from Reeders, Pennsylvania was the person who died, having received shrapnel wounds to his lungs and kidneys.

Both Terra Lliure and Catalan Red Liberation Army (ERCA) claimed responsibility. Residents claimed that anti-American slogans and graffiti near the bar at the time suggested the incident was linked to the extension of the Spain-United States military treaty (Pact of Madrid), which was first signed during the tenure of caudillo Francisco Franco in 1953.

Terra Lliure had previously claimed responsibility for an attack on an American consulate in Barcelona in October, which wounded eight sailors. A woman claiming to be from ERCA took responsibility "against an establishment of the Yankee war marines" in a call to news agency EFE. However, the authorities doubted its credibility.

See also
El Descanso bombing
1988 Naples bombing

References

1987 in Catalonia
1987 in international relations
1987 murders in Spain
Anti-Americanism
Attacks on bars in Europe
Attacks on military installations in the 1980s
Catalan nationalism
Crime in Barcelona
December 1987 crimes
December 1987 events in Europe
Explosions in 1987
Explosions in Catalonia
Murder in Catalonia
Terrorist incidents in Catalonia
Terrorist incidents in Spain in 1987
Building bombings in Spain
United Service Organizations